Allan Robert Butler, OAM (born 1976)  from Tumut, New South Wales is an Australian Paralympic athlete. In 1993, Butler moved to Canberra to take up a residential scholarship at the Australian Institute of Sport.

He won a gold medal at the 1992 Barcelona Games in the Men's 4 × 100 m Relay TS2,4 event. He also competed in the Men's 100 m TS4, Men's 200 m TS4 and Men's 400 m TS4 but did not medal.

Butler continues to be involved in Little Athletics in Tumut.

References

Paralympic athletes of Australia
Athletes (track and field) at the 1992 Summer Paralympics
Paralympic gold medalists for Australia
Recipients of the Medal of the Order of Australia
Living people
1976 births
Medalists at the 1992 Summer Paralympics
Australian Institute of Sport Paralympic track and field athletes
Paralympic medalists in athletics (track and field)
Australian male sprinters
Sprinters with limb difference
Paralympic sprinters
20th-century Australian people